Angelfire is an Internet service that offers website services. It is owned by Lycos, which also owns Tripod.com. Angelfire operates separately from Tripod.com and includes features such as blog building and a photo gallery builder. Free webpages are no longer available to new registrants and have been replaced by paid services.

History
Angelfire was founded in 1996 and was originally a combination Web site building and medical transcription service. Eventually the site dropped the transcription service and focused solely on website hosting, offering only paid memberships. The site was bought by Mountain View, California–based WhoWhere on October 20, 1997, which, in turn, was subsequently purchased by the search engine company Lycos on August 11, 1998 for US$133 million.

See also

References

External links
 
 About Angelfire / History of site page

Internet properties established in 1996
Web hosting
Web 1.0